The 2006–07 Vermont Catamounts season was their second in Hockey East. Led by new head coach Tim Bothwell, the Catamounts had 3 victories, compared to 27 defeats and 2 ties. Their conference record was 1 victory, 19 defeats and 1 tie.

Regular season

Schedule

Awards and honors

Hockey East All-Academic Team

References

Vermont Catamounts Women's Ice Hockey Season, 2006-07
Vermont Catamounts women's ice hockey seasons
Cata
Cata